Bernd G. Längin (1941–2008) was a journalist and author of multiple books. In addition, he worked as Chief Editor of GLOBUS, published by Verein für Deutsche Kulturbeziehungen im Ausland (VDA).

Bibliography
 Die Russlanddeutschen unter Doppeladler und Sowjetstern: Städte, Landschaften und Menschen auf alten Fotos. Augsburg, Weltbild 1991.
In English: The Russian Germans under the Double Eagle and the Soviet Star: Including a Pictorial History of Cities, Landscapes and People, Design and Printing in the United States of America by the Germans from Russia Heritage Collection North Dakota State University Libraries, Fargo, 2013, 
Deutschen Kolonien: Schauplätze und Schicksale 1884–1918. Hamburg: Mittler, 2004.
Die Amischen: vom Geheimnis des einfachen Lebens. [München?], 1990

References

1941 births
2008 deaths
German male journalists
Writers from Karlsruhe
German male writers
20th-century German journalists